Rondaniola bursaria is a species of fly in the family Cecidomyiidae, found in the Palearctic The larvae gall ground ivy (Glechoma hederacea).

References

External links
 Images representing  Cecidomyiidae at BOLD

Cecidomyiidae
Gall-inducing insects
Insects described in 1847
Nematoceran flies of Europe
Taxa named by Johann Jacob Bremi-Wolf